Gup is a village in the Khyber Pakhtunkhwa province of Pakistan. It is located at 34°9'15N 73°6'50E with an altitude of 1226 metres (4025 feet). Neighbouring settlements include Jalalia, Khaliala and Saliot.

References

Villages in Khyber Pakhtunkhwa